Kwangmyong is a North Korean "walled garden" national intranet service opened in the early 2000s. The Kwangmyong intranet system stands in contrast to the global Internet in North Korea, which is available to fewer people in the country.

The network uses domain names under the .kp top level domain that are not usually accessible from the global Internet. As of 2016 the network uses IPv4 addresses reserved for private networks in the 10.0.0.0/8 range, also known as 24-bit block as defined in RFC 1918. North Koreans often find it more convenient to access sites by their IP address rather than by domain name using Latin characters. Like the global Internet, the network hosts content accessible with web browsers, and provides an internal web search engine. It also provides email services and news groups. The intranet is managed by the Korea Computer Center.

History 
The first website in North Korea, the Naenara web portal, was made in 1996. Efforts to establish the Kwangmyong network on a national scale began as early as 1997, with some development of intranet services in the Rajin-Sonbong Economic Special Zone as early as 1995. The intranet was originally developed by the "Central Scientific and Technological Information Agency". The national Kwangmyong intranet was first in service during the early 2000s. North Korea's first email provider was Sili Bank, established in 2001.

Prior to 2006, North Koreans would use intranet chat rooms to organize meetups to play sports, such as basketball. Following an incident where around 300 North Korean intranet users organized a flash mob at the Pyongyang Gymnasium, all chat rooms were removed from the North Korean intranet. Regional chat rooms reportedly made a return in 2015.

In 2013, Anonymous-affiliated hackers claimed to have broken into North Korea's intranet. However, evidence for the claim was lacking.

A video conferencing system called Rakwon was developed at Kim Il-sung University in 2010. During the COVID-19 pandemic, it became much more popular for remote meetings and appeared regularly on news bulletins. Telemedicine and remote education systems have been developed.

Content
As of 2014, the Kwangmyong network was estimated to have between about 1,000 and 5,500 websites. Excélsior and Max Fisher of Vox estimated the number was about 5,000.

The Kwangmyong network is composed of many websites and services. Some sites host political and economic propaganda. Scientific and cultural information and fields of knowledge among other topics can be found elsewhere. Over 30 million mostly scientific or technical documents were reportedly posted to the intranet as of 2007.

Websites of various North Korean government agencies including provincial government, cultural institutions, major universities and libraries, some local schools, and some of the major industrial and commercial organizations are accessible to users. The network also contains (mostly science-related) websites from the open Internet that are downloaded, reviewed and censored.

An internal emailing service is available on the Kwangmyong network. A search engine is in use for browsing the Kwangmyong intranet. The search engine reportedly goes by the name "Naenara", which means "Our Country". A Facebook-like social networking service in use by professors and university students existed as of 2013, and was used to post birthday messages. CNN reported in 2017 that a "North Korean equivalent to Facebook" exists. Message boards are known to exist on the network. An IPTV video-streaming service called Manbang (만방), Korean for "Everyone", was reportedly launched in August 2016, though the name Manbang appeared in North Korean technology as early as 2013. It is accessed by a Wi-Fi-enabled set-top box. It can be accessed through smartphones and tablet computers. Reportedly the Kwangmyong has been used for online dating. Chat rooms were used by North Koreans interested in sports until 2006, when the chat rooms were removed. Regional chat rooms were added in 2015.

Domestic state news services are available on the network, such as the Korean Central News Agency, Rodong Sinmun, and Voice of Korea. Scientific research websites of academic and scholarly works devoted to the network are served through web-based academic exchanges and information sharing such as the Academy of Sciences for Science and Technology and the Academy of Sciences for Medical Science. An electronic library is present on the network, which also hosts video lectures for various topics.

Some e-commerce and e-banking websites exist on the network. Some video games also exist on the intranet. One of the games available on the Kwangmyong is Korean chess. Phones provide access to e-books and mobile payment. Some cultural websites are among the few .kp domain websites which have been openly accessible to foreigners through the global Internet, such as at least one culinary site and one displaying the country's film industry. Other services in use on the intranet include dictionaries, telehealth, and text messaging services. Reportedly a travel website allowed North Koreans to plan vacations within the country.

Network access
Kwangmyong is designed to be accessible only from within North Korea. Access is available within major cities and counties, as well as universities and major industrial and commercial organizations. For example, a library at the Pyongyang Sci-Tech Complex provides access to the intranet, and is reportedly used by different types of people, including factory workers, children and researchers for various purposes. About 3,000 computer terminals are usable there. The intranet is also accessible from another library at the Grand People's Study House.

Sites in the network are commonly accessed using 24-bit block private IPv4 addresses.

The first "internet café" (or "intranet cafe") in North Korea was opened in Pyongyang, where one may access the country's intranet services. It opened in 2002, near Kwangbok station, and has about 100 computers. It was opened by a Seoul company named Hoonnet, and a North Korean company named Jangsaeng General Trade Company. These cafes, also known as "PC rooms" or "Information Technology Stores", began appearing across North Korea as soon as the early 2000s, and can be accessed for a fee. The cafes provide other paid services as well, such as computing classes. As of 2005, the price for accessing these services was considered prohibitively expensive for the average North Korean citizen, according to Daily NK.

The process of installing an approved personal computer in North Korean homes which would be capable of accessing the intranet requires inspection and authorization from local government authorities. As of 2010, an estimated 200,000 such personal computers were in Pyongyang private homes, and access to the Kwangmyong is more common among people in cities compared to those in rural areas.

In addition to access from personal computers, the national intranet may be accessed from mobile devices. Kwangmyong has 24-hour unlimited access by dial-up telephone line. , a number of Android-based tablet computer products, including the Samjiyon tablet computer, can be purchased in North Korea that give access to Kwangmyong. A 2017 estimate put the number of mobile phones in North Korea at between 2.5 and 3 million. In 2020, another estimate put the number of mobile phone users at 4.5 million. In recent years, these have been the more common way for North Koreans to access websites on the Kwangmyong intranet. Access to the global Internet or phone numbers outside of North Korea is not permitted aside from highest-ranked government officials and certain employees of Korea Computer Center. Like personal computers, phones must be approved by authorities. According to Radio Free Asia, the government began requiring cell phone users to install surveillance software to access the intranet.

In 2018, North Korea unveiled a new Wi-Fi service called Mirae ("Future"), which allowed mobile devices to access the intranet network in Pyongyang.

Languages
The network uses Korean as the main interface language, though the government's web portal (Naenara), is multilingual. There is a dictionary available to users for translation between Korean and Russian, Chinese, English, French, German and Japanese, with a database containing at least 1,700,000 words, to assist users who may not be familiar with foreign languages.

Different websites on the intranet may be available in different sets of languages. A website that sells postage stamps is available in Korean, English, and Chinese. The writings of the Kim family are available in Korean, Japanese, Russian, and Chinese.

Information control
Kwangmyong is designed to be used only within North Korea, and is referred to as an intranet. Kwangmyong prevents domestic users within North Korea from freely accessing foreign content or information and typically prevents foreigners from accessing domestic content. According to Daily NK, it "prevents the leak of classified data" and "functions as a form of information censorship, preventing undesirable information from being accessed". Thus, sensitive topics and information are unlikely to surface on Kwangmyong due to the absence of a link to the outside world and the censorship that occurs. Kwangmyong is maintained and monitored by government-related entities. However, large amounts of material from the global Internet ends up on Kwangmyong, following processing. The operating systems of government-approved phones reject access to any applications that are not also approved by the government.

While foreigners in North Korea are generally not allowed to access Kwangmyong, they may have access to the global Internet. For security reasons networks with Internet and intranet access are air gapped so that computers with Internet access are not housed in the same location as computers with Kwangmyong access.

Given that there is no direct connection to the outside Internet, unwanted information cannot enter the network. Information is filtered and processed by government agencies before being hosted on the North Korean Intranet. Myanmar and Cuba also use a similar network system that is separated from the rest of the Internet, and Iran has been reported as having future plans to implement such a network, though it is claimed that it would work alongside the Internet and would not replace it.

List of sites 
Below is a list of sites that were listed on Kwangmyong's website portal in 2016.

Below is a list of sites that are not directly listed on www.sciteco.aca.kp (the Kwangmyong website portal) in 2016 and sites that have been confirmed to have been created on Kwangmyong after 2016.

See also

Internet in North Korea
Internet censorship in North Korea
Red Star OS

References

External links
List of sites on Kwangmyong at North Korea Tech
Video of surfing on Kwangmyong at Yle Areena
Kwangmyong computer network at North Korea Economy Watch
Digital Divide on the Korean Peninsula at Institute for Corean-American Studies
Hermit Surfers of P'yongyang at Defense Technical Information Center

Further reading 

 
 
 
 
 
 
 
 
 
 

Internet in North Korea
Internet censorship
Mass surveillance
Internet properties established in 2000
2000 establishments in Korea
Wide area networks
Telecommunications companies of North Korea